The Chilliwack Progress was first published on April 16, 1891.  It remains the longest continuously published newspaper in British Columbia.

History

Seeing a need for a daily newspaper William Thomas (W.T) Jackman purchased a printing and newspaper press in Toronto and shipped it to Chilliwack. He set up shop at 39 Yale Road East (now 46169 Yale Road East) and published the first edition of the Chilliwack Progress on April 16, 1891. The paper stayed at that location until 1974.

The paper is now run by Black Press Media.

On March 23, 2020, it was announced that due to the COVID-19 pandemic the Chilliwack progress was moving to one print edition a week starting March 26, 2020, as the global pandemic continues.

Bibliography
Notes

References 

Publications established in 1891
Daily newspapers published in British Columbia
1891 establishments in British Columbia